The Limerick county football team represents Limerick in men's Gaelic football and is governed by Limerick GAA, the county board of the Gaelic Athletic Association. The team competes in the three major annual inter-county competitions; the All-Ireland Senior Football Championship, the Munster Senior Football Championship and the National Football League.

Limerick's home ground is Páirc na nGael, Limerick. The team's manager is Ray Dempsey.

Limerick was the first Munster county to win an All-Ireland Senior Football Championship (SFC). It has won two All-Ireland Senior Championships. The county last won the Munster Senior Championship and the All-Ireland Senior Championship in 1896. Limerick have never won the National League.

History
Limerick won the first All-Ireland Senior Football Championship (SFC) in 1887 and repeated this success in 1896, when it became the first non-Leinster team to beat the then all-conquering Dublin in a championship match.

The team did not play in the Munster Football Championship (1953–1964).

Limerick plays in Division 3 of the National Football League.

Colours and crest

Kit evolution

Current panel

(c)

INJ Player has had an injury which has affected recent involvement with the county team.
RET Player has since retired from the county team.
WD Player has since withdrawn from the county team due to a non-injury issue.

Jamie Lee was in New South Wales in 2020.

Current management team
Manager: Ray Dempsey, appointed for a two-year term, announced 7 October 2022
Selectors: Martin Barrett (Mayo), Michael Downey (Feohanagh/Castlemahon)
Coaches: Anthony Maher (Kerry), Eoin Joy (Fr Casey's), Mark Fitzgerald (Kerry)
Goalkeeping coach: John Chawke (Kildimo-Pallaskenry)

Managerial history

Players

Notable players

All Stars
Limerick has no All Stars.

Honours

National
All-Ireland Senior Football Championship
 Winners (2): 1887, 1896

National Football League Division 4
 Winners (3): 2010, 2013, 2020
Dr Croke Cup
 Winners (1): 1897

Provincial
Munster Senior Football Championship
 Winners (1): 1896
 Runners-up (13): 1888, 1895, 1901, 1905, 1922, 1934, 1965, 1991, 2003, 2004, 2009, 2010, 2022
Munster Junior Football Championship
 Winners (4): 1916, 1929, 1939, 1950
Munster Under-21 Football Championship
 Winners (1): 2000
 Runners-up (3): 1984, 2001, 2005
Munster Minor Football Championship
 Winners (1): 1956
 Runners-up (4): 1950, 1997, 1998, 2021 
McGrath Cup
 Winners (7): 1985, 1987, 1991, 2001, 2004, 2005, 2020
 Runners-up (3): 2007, 2008, 2017, 2023

References

 
County football teams